Ney Talkh is a village in Dar Agah Rural District, in the Central District of Hajjiabad County, Hormozgan Province, Iran. At the 2006 census, its population was 25, in 5 families.

References 

Populated places in Hajjiabad County